Pablo César Aguilar Benítez (born 2 April 1987) is a Paraguayan professional footballer who plays as a centre-back.

From March to July 2017, Aguilar served a ten-match suspension after head-butting a referee.

Club career

Early career
Aguilar won the Paraguayan Primera División title with his first club, Sportivo Luqueño, in 2007. He then transferred to Argentine Primera División side Colón de Santa Fe, where he played for one year. Subsequently, Aguilar played for San Luis of the Mexican Primera División, before joining Argentine Primera's side Arsenal de Sarandí.

Tijuana
In 2012, Aguilar was sent on loan to Club Tijuana. He started in 20 matches for the club during the Apertura tournament, which Tijuana won, defeating Toluca in the final, even scoring one of the goals himself.

América
On 18 December 2013, it was announced that Aguilar was transferred to Club América, with the announcement being made on the club's Twitter account.
On 8 March 2017, during the Copa MX round-of-16 match against Tijuana, Aguilar headbutted referee Fernando Hernández. Despite initially being given a ten-game suspension, a strike by the referee's association protesting the punishments of Aguilar and Enrique Triverio of Toluca ultimately led to a revised year-long ban for Aguilar from any official football activity. On 31 March, it was reported that both Aguilar and Triverio would appeal their bans to the Court of Arbitration for Sport.

Cruz Azul
In the summer of 2018, Aguilar officially became a player for Cruz Azul. On 21 July 2018, Aguilar debuted in a 3–0 victory against Puebla and played the 90 minutes.

International career
As of 3 June 2015, Aguilar has played in 22 games with the Paraguay national team, scoring four times. He scored his first goal on 17 October 2012 in the 1–0 victory against Peru.

International goals
Scores and results list Paraguay's goal tally first.

Personal life
In 2015, Aguilar became a naturalized Mexican citizen.

Honours
Sportivo Luqueño
 Primera División: Apertura 2007

Tijuana
 Liga MX: Apertura 2012

América
 Liga MX: Apertura 2014
 CONCACAF Champions League: 2014–15, 2015–16

Cruz Azul
 Liga MX: Guardianes 2021
 Copa MX: Apertura 2018
 Campeón de Campeones: 2021
 Supercopa MX: 2019
 Leagues Cup: 2019

Individual
 Liga MX Defender of the Year: 2018–19
 Liga MX Best XI: Guardianes 2021
 Liga MX All-Star: 2021

See also
 Players and Records in Paraguayan Football

References

External links

Pablo César Aguilar – Argentine Primera statistics at Fútbol XXI 

1987 births
Living people
Paraguayan footballers
Paraguayan expatriate footballers
Paraguay international footballers
Sportivo Luqueño players
Club Atlético Colón footballers
San Luis F.C. players
Club Tijuana footballers
Club América footballers
Arsenal de Sarandí footballers
Paraguayan Primera División players
Argentine Primera División players
Liga MX players
Expatriate footballers in Argentina
Expatriate footballers in Mexico
Paraguayan expatriate sportspeople in Argentina
Paraguayan expatriate sportspeople in Mexico
2015 Copa América players
Sportspeople from Luque
Association football central defenders
Naturalized citizens of Mexico
Cruz Azul footballers